Dagga is a word used in certain areas of Southern Africa for cannabis.

Dagga may also refer to:
Dagga (percussion), the stick used on the bass end of a dhol
Dagga (Tabla) - A musical instrument and part of tabla 
Dagga Couple (or DC), a South African pro-cannabis lobbyist organisation
Dagga Party, a South African political party founded in 2009
Leonotis leonurus, "wild dagga", a plant species in the mint family, Lamiaceae
Daggering, a Jamaican dance
Earthen plaster, a blend of clay, aggregate, and fiber used as building material